Paigham is a Pakistani social drama film, directed by Nazir Ajmeri, and co-produced by S. M. Yusuf and F. M. Sardar under banner F&Y Movies. It starred Shamim Ara, Sultan and Rukhsana. The film was remade by S. Suleman as Aaj Aur Kal (1976).

Paigham was a critical and commercial success. At annual Nigar Awards ceremony, it won an award in the category of Best comedian for Lehri.

Cast 

 Shamim Ara
 Sultana
 Rukhsana
 Lehri
 Rangeela
 M. Ismael
 Zeenat

Soundtrack

Awards 

At 1964 Nigar Awards, it received an award:
 Best comedian - Lehri

References 

Urdu-language Pakistani films
1960s Urdu-language films
Pakistani drama films
Pakistani black-and-white films